Saint-Nicolas-de-la-Balerme is a commune in the Lot-et-Garonne department in south-western France.

Geography
The river Auroue forms all of the commune's eastern border, then flows into the Garonne, which forms all of its northern border.

See also
Communes of the Lot-et-Garonne department

References

Saintnicolasdelabalerme